CIM Bank is a Swiss private bank. Founded in Geneva in 1990, by Francesco Signorio. Since then the Bank has been continuously growing every year. The Bank actually serves around 10'000 institutional, corporate and private clients worldwide. 

The Bank has 165 employees and is located in Geneva, Wollerau and Lugano. CIM Bank is engaged in commercial transactions, commodities trading, investment banking, asset management and online trading. CIM Bank is regulated by FINMA, and is a member of the Swiss Bankers Association. CIM Bank is also a member of SIX Swiss Exchange.

The Bank is currently allowing their customers to trade in more than 20 currencies and various precious metals.

Services
CIM Bank provides personal current accounts, commercial (corporate) accounts and deposit accounts. It also provides online trading services in partnership with Interactive Brokers.

One of their strengths is the multi-currency account, allowing their clients to use a variety of currencies simply and efficiently.

The Bank provides a variety of tools to help companies trades in global markets.

They have also made a process to open an online account with electronic signatures and digital passports authentification.

Their clients have access to many card options: Union Pay, Visa, Mastercard, Swiss Bankers and American Express.

Values 
For CIM Bank every client is unique. The bank is committed to assist every client in their every day needs in order to help them maximize the value of their business.

The strength of the bank resides in the diversity of their Private Bankers. Their team speaks multiple languages and uses their skills to serve private and institutional customers by offering personalized relationships and individual financial solutions.

Regulations 
As a Swiss Bank, CIM Bank are under the banking laws of Switzerland and they need to report to the FINMA which is also making sure the Bank is respecting the laws. Furthermore, the deposits made are covered up to a limit of 100’000 CHF per client by Esisuisse.

References

External links

 Official website

Banks of Switzerland
Companies based in Geneva